Kowalik may refer to:

 Kowalik, Warmian-Masurian Voivodeship, a village in Poland
 Kowalik (surname), a Polish surname